Kaladar is a compact rural community and unincorporated area in the municipality of Addington Highlands, Lennox and Addington County in Eastern Ontario, Canada. It is located at the junction of Ontario Highway 7 and Ontario Highway 41.

To the north is a quaint little town by the name of Northbrook. Further north is Bon Echo Provincial Park. Other nearby natural areas are the Kaladar Pine Barrens Conservation Reserve and Puzzle Lake Provincial Park.

This area was first settled following the construction of the Addington Road in 1857. It was originally named Scouten after its first postmaster. The former Canadian Pacific Railway Havelock Subdivision rail bed passing through the town has been turned into a rail trail and become part of the Trans Canada Trail. The Kaladar fire tower was situated at the north end of the village just off the highway, but was removed some time in the 1970s or 1980s.

The name is also used for Kaladar Township, a geographic township, in which Kaladar lies roughly at the centre.

References

Other map sources:

Communities in Lennox and Addington County